The South Moluccas are a group of islands within Indonesia claimed by the Republic of South Maluku.

 Ambon
 Aru Islands
 Babar Islands
 Banda Islands
 Buru
 Kai Islands
 Leti Islands
 Seram
 Seram Laut
 Tanimbar Islands
 Watebela
 Wetar

South Moluccas